The 1968 Gael Linn Cup, the most important representative competition for elite level participants in the women's team field sport of camogie, was won by Leinster, who defeated Ulster in the final, played at Croke Park.

Arrangements
Judy Doyle scored five goals as Leinster defeated Connacht by 7–9 to 3–1 at Pearse Park. Munster goalkeeper, Mel Cummins, kept the margin from being more than 8–4 to 4–4 as they lost to Ulster at Fermoy. Ally Hussey was the Leinster star in the final against Ulster, dominating the game from the centre-back position. It was the first Gael Linn final to be played at Corke Park.Agnes Hourigan wrote in the Irish Press: Although there were eight of the Antrim side on the Ulster team, Ulster played as individuals and thus much of their valuable approach work was wasted.

Final stages

References

External links
 Camogie Association

1968 in camogie
1968
1968 in Northern Ireland sport